The Next Generation Multiple Warhead System, or NGMWS, is a weapon developed by MBDA to defeat hard and deeply buried targets (hence an alternative name, HARDBUT). 

The system includes a precursor charge and a follow-through bomb. Development was funded by the British and French ministries of defence.

References

Bombs